John Herbert Fyfe (18 March 1873 – 18 February 1950) was a Scottish footballer who played as a right winger.

Career
Fyfe played club football for Glasgow South-Western, St Mirren and Third Lanark, and represented Scotland in 1895.

Later and personal life
Fyfe later emigrated to India, but eventually relocated to southern England from where his wife originated. His son Ken represented Scotland at rugby in the 1930s.

References

1873 deaths
1950 deaths
Scottish footballers
Scottish emigrants to India
People from Girvan
Footballers from South Ayrshire
Scotland international footballers
Third Lanark A.C. players
Association football wingers
South Western F.C. players
St Mirren F.C. players
Scottish Junior Football Association players
Scotland junior international footballers